Lenaderg railway station was on the Banbridge Junction Railway which ran from Scarva to Banbridge in Northern Ireland.

History

The station was opened on 1 January 1904. It was closed to passengers from 1 July 1904 to 1 July 1907.

The station closed on 2 May 1955.

References 

Disused railway stations in County Down
Railway stations opened in 1904
Railway stations closed in 1955
1904 establishments in Ireland
1955 disestablishments in Northern Ireland
Railway stations in Northern Ireland opened in the 20th century